This is a list of members of the Australian House of Representatives of the 45th Parliament of Australia (2016–2019).

The 45th Parliament, elected on 2 July 2016, was sworn in on its opening on 30 August 2016.

Notes

References

Members of Australian parliaments by term
21st-century Australian politicians
2010s politics-related lists